Myron G. Nussbaum (born December 29, 1923) is an American actor and director.

Early years
Nussbaum was born to a Jewish family and grew up in the Albany Park area of Chicago. He married soon after he returned to Chicago following military service during World War II. His Army assignments included being chief of the message centre for General Dwight D. Eisenhower, in which role he dispatched the official notification of Germany's surrender. For 20 years, he worked with his brother-in-law in an extermination business.

Career
Nussbaum's acting career started in community theater in the 1950s. In the 1960s, he was active in a developing professional theatrical community in Chicago, meeting a young David Mamet in the process. He appeared in many of Mamet's plays both on and off Broadway, as well as in Chicago. His films include Field of Dreams, House of Games, Things Change, Fatal Attraction and Men In Black.

As a director, his work has included Where Have You Gone, Jimmy Stewart? (2002) by Art Shay.

Nussbaum also appeared in local TV commercials for Chicago's Northwest Federal Savings (with the jingle, "It's Northwest Federal Savings time, sixty-three hours a week"). He also did national commercials for United Airlines and Scope mouthwash.

As of April 2019, Nussbaum was still acting at the age of 95.

Personal life
Nussbaum was married to Annette Brenner from 1949 until her death in 2003.  He married Julie Brudlos in 2004. He has 3 children with his first wife, Jack, Karen, and Susan.

Recognition
Nussbaum received the following Jeff Awards:

Filmography
The Monitors (1969) as Exercise Chief
T.R. Baskin (1971) as Office Manager
Harry and Tonto (1974) as Old Age Home Clerk
Towing (1978) as Phil
House of Games (1987) as Joey
Fatal Attraction (1987) as Bob Drimmer
Things Change (1988) as Mr. Green
Field of Dreams (1989) as Principal
Desperate Hours (1990) as Mr. Nelson
Gladiator (1992) as Doctor
Gypsy (1993) as Weber, Los Angeles Theatre Manager 
Losing Isaiah (1995) as Dr. Jamison
Steal Big Steal Little (1995) as Sam Barlow, Clifford Downey's Attorney
Men In Black (1997) as Gentle Rosenberg
Early Edition (1997) - Yuri Rosanov
The Game of Their Lives (2005) as Johnny Abruzzo
Dirty Work (2006) as Gaga
Osso Bucco (2008) as Uncle Sil
Tom of Your Life (2020) as Father McMurphy

References

External links
Personal remembrances
Illinois Arts Alliance Arts Legend citation
Goodman Theatre Artist Bio
Mike Nussbaum Is 90 and Can Do More Pushups than You

Mike Nussbaum Papers at the Newberry Library

1923 births
Living people
Jewish American male actors
American male film actors
American male television actors
Male actors from Chicago
American military personnel of World War II
21st-century American Jews